Platnickia is a genus of spiders in the family Zodariidae. It was first described in 1991 by Jocqué. , it contains 5 South American species.

References

Zodariidae
Araneomorphae genera
Spiders of South America